George Jackson Churchward created for the Great Western Railway a family of standard classes of locomotive, based on a limited set of shared dimensions and components, and his principles were followed by his successors. Most of these locomotives had two cylinders, placed outside the frames, and they are listed here, ranging in size from small-wheeled 2-6-2T tank locos to 2-8-0 express freight engines.

History of standardisation 
Standardisation on the GWR started with Daniel Gooch, its first Locomotive Superintendent, who enforced uniformity on third-party suppliers of parts by issuing lithographed copies of drawings and iron templates to check accurate fitting. This was carried through once the GWR built its own works at Swindon, and standard parts were also shared by different classes of locomotive. Joseph Armstrong (and his brother George) used similar techniques at Wolverhampton, and continued Gooch's policy when he replaced him at Swindon. William Dean, Armstrong's successor, designed (among others) four classes of locomotive, 2-4-0 and 0-6-0 tender and tank engines, which shared many standard components. However, it was  Churchward who carried the policy to lengths which made GWR locomotives distinctive and shaped their development until the nationalisation of the railways.

Even before Churchward succeeded Dean as Locomotive Superintendent in 1902, he had in 1901 published a list of proposed new locomotive classes of a revolutionary nature. He began by designing a range of standard components, then constructed a variety of locomotive designs of different sizes and purposes around these items. These locomotives were to have two outside cylinders, inside frames and motion, generous piston valves, and identical left/right cylinder castings, and they shared three coupled wheel sizes, two standard boilers and a single size of leading/trailing wheel. When Churchward took over the job, he began to create prototypes to test and evaluate his ideas, and they were developed into a series of locomotive classes that appeared throughout Churchward's time in office, and were further developed and expanded by both Charles Collett and Frederick Hawksworth, his successors up to the end of the GWR. Indeed, the proposed 4-6-0  with 5 ft 8 in driving wheels did not appear until Collett built the Granges in 1936. Even after the GWR ceased to exist, a new 'class' of Mogul was developed on the West Somerset Railway.

Comparison of locomotive classes 
This table summarises the classes that developed from Churchward's proposals. It is simplified in that it suggests the classes were sets of identical engines, whereas the prototypes often differed in some respects from later class members, and there was a constant move to improve the locomotives by changing boilers, enlarging cylinders and tweaking other details of their construction. By and large, the details and dimensions given were common to most members of the class in their final form. The details of Churchward's original proposed locomotives and boilers are shaded; no classes were built to exactly those dimensions. However, the proposed classes will sort adjacent to the most closely matching real classes. The WSR Mogul is shaded pink.

This table does not include
 the 4-cylinder classes - Stars, Castles and Kings
 similar looking inside-cylinder classes - 3901 2-6-2Ts, 5600 0-6-2Ts, and 2251 0-6-0s
 non-standard classes - outside-cylindered ex-ROD 3000 2-8-0s

List of boilers 
The history of GWR boilers is long and complex. This table lists only the principal dimensions of the boilers (including proposed boilers) mentioned in the table of standard classes.

Notes

References 
 
 
 
 
 
 
 
 
 

 
Great Western
Great Western